Aime Kiwakana Kiala, born Emmanuel Kiala (died 1992), was a soukous recording artist, composer and vocalist, in the Democratic Republic of the Congo (DRC). He was once a member of the soukous band TPOK Jazz, led by Franco Luambo, which dominated the Congolese music scene from the 1950s through the 1980s.

External links
 Overview of Composition of TPOK Jazz

See also
 Franco Luambo
 Sam Mangwana
 Josky Kiambukuta
 Simaro Lutumba
 Ndombe Opetum
 Youlou Mabiala
 Mose Fan Fan
 Wuta Mayi
 TPOK Jazz
 List of African musicians

References

TPOK Jazz members
20th-century Democratic Republic of the Congo male singers
Soukous musicians
Year of birth missing
1992 deaths